Paderno Dugnano is a town and comune in the Metropolitan City of Milan, in Lombardy, northern Italy.  It is bounded by comuni of Senago, Limbiate, Varedo, Cusano Milanino, Cormano, Nova Milanese, Bollate, Novate Milanese, Cinisello Balsamo. Paderno Dugnano is about 15 kilometers from the center of Milan.

Following the unification of Italy in 1861, a reorganization of the internal subdivisions of the country ensued. By decree of 17 March 1869, the comuni of Paderno, Dugnano, Incirano, Cassina Amata, and Palazzolo Milanese were fused into a new comune called Paderno Milanese.

Other names for the comune were proposed (including Padergnano and Borgosole) through the 1880s.
By decree of 1 February 1886, the comune's name was formally changed to the current name of Paderno Dugnano.

Paderno Dugnano received the honorary title of city with a presidential decree on 25 September 1989.

Twin towns
Paderno Dugnano is twinned with:
 Inđija, Serbia

References

Cities and towns in Lombardy